BEC World Public Company Limited is a Thai media conglomerate, best known as the operator of television Channel 3. It was founded in 1990 and listed on the Stock Exchange of Thailand in 1995, though the group began doing business in 1967 as Bangkok Entertainment Co., Ltd., now a subsidiary. The business was founded by Vichai Maleenont, and continues to be majorly owned by the Maleenont family, though the company underwent major restructuring in the 2010s in response to major losses following landscape changes in the broadcast industry.

References

 
Mass media companies of Thailand
Companies listed on the Stock Exchange of Thailand